The 2013–14 All-Ireland Senior Club Hurling Championship was the 44th staging of the All-Ireland championship since its establishment in 1970. The championship began on 13 October 2013 and ended on 17 March 2014.

St. Thomas's were the defending champions, however, they failed to emerge from the county championship in Galway.

Team summaries

Participating clubs

Fixtures/results

Leinster Senior Club Hurling Championship

Munster Senior Club Hurling Championship

Ulster Senior Club Hurling Championship

All-Ireland Senior Club Hurling Championship

Championship statistics

Miscellaneous

 Mount Leinster Rangers win the Leinster title for the first time in their history. It is the first time that any team from Carlow has claimed a Leinster title at senior level.
 Oulart-the Ballagh lose the Leinster final for the fourth consecutive year.

Top scorers

Top scorers overall

Top scorers in a single game

References

2013 in hurling
2014 in hurling
All-Ireland Senior Club Hurling Championship